The Goya Award for Best New Director is the Goya awarded yearly to the best debuting director. The award was first presented at the fourth edition of the Goya Awards with Ana Díez being the first winner for her film Ander eta Yul.

Three directors have won this category and later have received the Best Director award, Alejandro Amenábar won for Tesis (1996) and went on to win Best Director twice, for The Others (2001) and The Sea Inside (2005); Fernando León de Aranoa won for Familia (1997) and later won Best Director thrice, for Barrio (1998), Mondays in the Sun (2002) and The Good Boss (2022); and Juan Antonio Bayona won for The Orphanage (2007) and went on to win Best Director twice, for The Impossible (2012) and A Monster Calls (2016).

Five films have won both this award and Best Film, Agustín Díaz Yanes's Nobody Will Speak of Us When We're Dead (1995), Alejandro Amenábar's Tesis (1996), Achero Mañas's Pellet (2000), Raúl Arévalo's The Fury of a Patient Man (2016) and Pilar Palomero's Schoolgirls (2020). Animator Enrique Gato became the first to historically win the award for an animated film with 
Tad, The Lost Explorer.

Winners and nominees

1980s

1990s

2000s

2010s

2020

Statistics
The following list is for Best New Director nominees and winners that went on to win or be nominated for Best Director. The times that the directors won either of the categories are in bold.

References

External links
Official site
IMDb: Goya Awards

New director
Awards for best director
Directorial debut film awards